Bishop Eustace may refer to:

 Eustace (bishop of Ely) (died 1215), Lord Chancellor of England, Dean of Salisbury and Bishop of Ely
 Eustace of Fauconberg (died 1228), Bishop of London and Lord High Treasurer
 Bartholomew J. Eustace (1887–1956), American Roman Catholic prelate and Bishop of Camden 
Eustace Preparatory School, a Catholic high school in Pennsauken Township, New Jersey